Chandradhar Barua (15 October 1874 – 26 October 1961) was a writer, poet, dramatist and lyricist from Assam of Jonaki Era, the age of romanticism of Assamese literature. Barua was born at Dergaon, Golaghat, Assam on 15 October 1878. He was second president of the Asam Sahitya Sabha in 1918 held at Goalpara. He was the founder secretary of Asam Sahitya Sabha Patrika, an official journal of the Asam Sahitya Sabha established at 1927 and held in that position till 1936. He also represented India at the Round Table Conference held at London in 1930.

Literary works
Poetry Collections
 Ranjan, 
 Bidyut Bikash, 
 Kamrup Jiyori,
 Muktaboli.

Novel
 Shanti.

Dramas
 Meghnad Badh, 
 Bhagya Porikha, 
 Mughal Bijoy, 
 Ahom Sandhya etc.

See also
 Assamese literature
 History of Assamese literature
 List of Asam Sahitya Sabha presidents
 List of Assamese writers with their pen names

References

External links
 Read original writings of Chandradhar Barua at Assamese wikisource

Novelists from Assam
Assamese-language poets
Asom Sahitya Sabha Presidents
1870s births
1961 deaths
20th-century Indian novelists
Indian male dramatists and playwrights
Indian male novelists
Indian male poets
Writers in British India
People from Dergaon
20th-century Indian poets
20th-century Indian dramatists and playwrights
Poets from Assam
Dramatists and playwrights from Assam
20th-century Indian male writers